St Aldhelm's Church is a Grade II* listed Gothic Revival Anglican church in the Branksome area of Poole, Dorset, England.

History 
The church was built 1892-94 by George Frederick Bodley and Thomas Garner.

Gallery

See also 
 List of churches in Poole

References

Churches in Poole
Grade II* listed churches in Dorset
19th-century Church of England church buildings
Gothic Revival architecture in Dorset
Gothic Revival church buildings in England
Church of England church buildings in Dorset
Churches completed in 1894
1894 establishments in England